A residence is a place (normally a building) used as a home or dwelling, where people reside.

Residence may more specifically refer to:

 Domicile (law), a legal term for residence
 Habitual residence, a civil law term dealing with the status of refugees, and child abduction
 Residence in English family law, pertaining to where children should live in the case of disputes
 Residence or residence hall (UK) accommodating college or university students, known in the US as a dormitory
 Residenz, the German term for residence which normally means the city palace of a noble family
 Tax residence, to determine the location of someone's home for tax purposes

See also
 
 
 Reside, a real estate magazine
 Residency (disambiguation)
 Resident (disambiguation)
 Shelter (disambiguation)

Broad-concept articles
Home
Living arrangements
Human habitats